Manfred Stolle (born 5 March 1937) is a German former javelin thrower who competed in the 1968 Summer Olympics and in the 1972 Summer Olympics.

References

1937 births
Living people
East German male javelin throwers
Olympic athletes of East Germany
Athletes (track and field) at the 1968 Summer Olympics
Athletes (track and field) at the 1972 Summer Olympics
Sportspeople from Leipzig